Barrington Russell (born March 2, 1958) is an American politician who served in the Florida House of Representatives from the 95th district from 2016 to 2018.

References

1958 births
Living people
Democratic Party members of the Florida House of Representatives